The Super Bowl XXXV halftime show took place on January 28, 2001 at the Raymond James Stadium in Tampa, Florida as part of Super Bowl XXXV. The show was titled, "The Kings of Rock and Pop". It was headlined by Aerosmith and NSYNC, and also featured appearances from Mary J. Blige, Britney Spears, Nelly, Tremors, and The Earthquake Horns.

Production
The show was produced by MTV, then a sister network of CBS, the latter of whom was the broadcaster of Super Bowl XXXV.

The show was sponsored by E-Trade.

At the time of the show, Aerosmith was promoting the upcoming release of their album Just Push Play.

For the first time in a Super Bowl halftime show, fans stood on the field around the stage.

Summary
The show featured a back-and-forth medley between Aerosmith and NSYNC.

The show was preceded by a prerecorded skit featuring Ben Stiller, Adam Sandler, and Chris Rock with Aerosmith and NSYNC.

The show began with NSYNC performing "Bye Bye Bye". This was followed by Aerosmith performing "I Don't Want to Miss a Thing".

Next, NSYNC, joined by Tremors featuring The Earthquake Horns, performed "It's Gonna Be Me". At the end of the song, Aerosmith front-man Steven Tyler sang a final line ("It's gonna be me"),, before Aerosmith performed "Jaded".

The show ended with NSYNC and Aerosmith uniting to perform the latter's song "Walk This Way", joined by Britney Spears, Nelly (who rapped part of "E.I."), and Mary J. Blige. "I didn't hit on Britney," declared Tyler. "But I did tell her that I wanted to trade shirts with her, and she did…. Everybody loves to take the piss out of her, but she brings joy to a lot of people."

Setlist
 Pre-recorded intro sketch with Ben Stiller, Adam Sandler, Chris Rock, Aerosmith, and NSYNC
 "Bye Bye Bye" (NSYNC)
 "I Don't Want to Miss a Thing" (Aerosmith)
 "It's Gonna Be Me" (NSYNC and Tremors featuring The Earthquake Horns)
 "Jaded" (Aerosmith)
 "Walk This Way" (Aerosmith, NSYNC, Britney Spears, Mary J. Blige, Nelly (contains elements of "E.I.")

Reception

Critical
Some outlets have, retrospectively, ranked it as among the best Super Bowl halftime shows.

Commercial
Artists featured saw an increase in sales following the performance. NSYNC's latest album, No Strings Attached, saw a 23% increase in sales in the week following the performance. Britney Spears' album Oops!... I Did It Again saw a 4% increase in sales in the week after the performance. Nelly's latest album Country Grammar saw a 26% increase in sales in the week after the performance.

References

MTV
2001 in American music
2001 in Florida
Aerosmith
NSYNC
Britney Spears
Nelly
Mary J. Blige
035
Television controversies in the United States
January 2001 events in the United States